Panegyrtes scutellatus is a species of beetle in the family Cerambycidae. It was described by Galileo and Martins in 1995. It is known from Brazil.

References

Desmiphorini
Beetles described in 1995